Thumbelina is a Danish fairy tale by Hans Christian Andersen, first published in 1835.

Thumbelina may also refer to:

Films
 Thumbelina (1964 film), a Russian animated film produced by Soyuzmultfilm
 Thumbelina (1978 film), a Japanese anime film produced by Toei Animation
 Thumbelina (1993 film), an Australian animated film produced by Burbank Animation Studios
 Thumbelina (1994 film), a 1994 animated film directed by Don Bluth, also based on the Andersen tale
 The Adventures of Tom Thumb and Thumbelina, a 2002 animated film directed by Glenn Chaika
 Barbie Thumbelina, a 2009 animated film inspired by the fairy tale with Barbie as the lead role

Television
 "Thumbelina" (Faerie Tale Theatre), an episode of Faerie Tale Theatre
 Thumbelina: A Magical Story, a Japanese anime television Series later edited into an eighty-minute film
 Oyayubihime (Thumb Princess), a Japanese TV movie

Music
 Thumbelina (soundtrack), the soundtrack to the 1994 Don Bluth film, or the title track
 "Thumbelina" (Frank Loesser song), a song from Hans Christian Andersen, a 1952 Hollywood musical film
 "Thumbelina", a song by The Pretenders from their 1984 album Learning to Crawl
 "Thumbelina", a song by Tracy Bonham from the 2000 album Down Here
 "Thumbelina", a song by Nightmare of You from the 2005 album Nightmare of You

In nature
 Thumbelina (horse), born 2001, currently the world's smallest horse
 Thumbelina, one of the Canadian Parliamentary Cats
 Thumbelina triggerplant (Stylidium pulchellum), a species of Stylidium

Other
 Thumbelina (comics), a mutant super villain in the Marvel Comics universe most well known as a member of the Mutant Liberation Front
 Thumbprint cookie, a type of fruit preserves-filled cookie, also known as a thumbelina cookie